Webster v. Doe, 486 U.S. 592 (1988), is a case decided by the United States Supreme Court that presented statutory and constitutional claims by a former CIA employee who alleged that his termination was the result of discrimination based on sexual orientation.

Background
The National Security Act of 1947 authorizes the Director of the CIA "in his discretion" to terminate the employment of any employee whenever he shall deem it to be in the security interests of the United States. John Doe, a CIA employee, voluntarily admitted to a CIA security guard that he was a homosexual. Despite having previously received ratings of "excellent" and "outstanding" employee performance, the employee was placed on administrative leave and later terminated as the result of his admission. William J. Casey, the Director of the CIA at that time, cited Doe's homosexuality as a threat to security. (Note that even though William H. Webster is named as the petitioner, Casey was the Director at the time of Doe's termination.)

Opinion of the Court
The issue presented before the Supreme Court was whether, and to what extent, the termination decisions of the Director under 102(c) are judicially reviewable. The Court, in an opinion delivered by Chief Justice Rehnquist, held that Section 102(c) of the National Security Act, 50 U.S.C. 403(c), precluded review under the Administrative Procedure Act. However, the Court held that the Act did not preclude review of constitutional claims (as opposed to the procedural claims). The Court reasoned that Congress should not be taken to have intended to preclude constitutional claims unless it has explicitly so provided (603).

Dissent
Justice Scalia was the only justice to completely dissent; Justice O'Connor concurred in part and dissented in part while Justice Kennedy took no part in the consideration or decision of the case. Justice Scalia wrote in his dissent, "Neither the Constitution, nor our laws, nor common sense gives an individual a right to come into court to litigate the reasons for his dismissal as an intelligence agent" (620).

See also
 Don't ask, don't tell
 List of United States Supreme Court cases, volume 486
 List of United States Supreme Court cases
 Lists of United States Supreme Court cases by volume
 List of United States Supreme Court cases by the Rehnquist Court

References

Further reading

External links
 

United States Supreme Court cases
United States Supreme Court cases of the Rehnquist Court
United States administrative case law
1988 in United States case law
Central Intelligence Agency
United States LGBT rights case law
1988 in LGBT history